The Smashup are a post-hardcore / punk rock band from Brooklyn, New York. They formed in 2001. They are currently signed to Warcon Records.

They released their self-titled debut EP in 2004 and their first studio album "Being and Becoming" in 2005, featuring songs such as "Never Going To Kill Us", "No Name", and "Effigy." The song "Effigy" was featured on the Saw III soundtrack and the song "Never Going to Kill Us" on the Feast soundtrack.

In 2010 the band signed with Eulogy Recordings and released their second album through the label in March of that year.

The band signed to Glasstone Records for the UK release of their album The Sea and the Serpents Beneath.

Line up

Current members
Sean Cuthbert - Vocals
Vin Alfieri - Guitar/Vocals
Vinny G - Guitar
Joshua Brain Jaffe - Bass
Bret D'Louhy- Drums

Previous Members
Watt White - Vocals
Rich Liegey - Bass
Ant Cee - Drums

Tour information
In 2006, they toured alongside Megadeth, Lamb of God and others as a second stage act in Dave Mustaine's Gigantour 2006. They also toured during Vans Warped Tour and the 2006 Taste of Chaos tour.

Discography

Studio albums
2005: Untreatable (UK release) – Mighty Atom
2005: Being and Becoming – Warcon
2010: The Sea and the Serpents Beneath – Eulogy
2010: The Sea and the Serpents Beneath (UK/EU release) – Glasstone Records

EPs
2004: The Smashup EP

References

External links
 The SmashUp at MySpace
 The SmashUp at purevolume

American post-hardcore musical groups
Musical groups from Brooklyn
Punk rock groups from New York (state)
Musical groups established in 2001